This is a list of Mexican brands, which encompasses brand-name products and services produced by companies in Mexico.

Mexican brands

  Aeroméxico – flag carrier airline of Mexico based in Mexico City
  Ah Cacao Real Chocolate
  Alpura 
  América Móvil 
  Atletica 
  Banco Azteca 
  Banorte 
  Barcel 
  Canel's – chewing gum and confectionery manufacturer, established in 1925.
  Carso Global Telecom 
  Casa Dragones 
  Cemento Cruz Azul 
  Cemex 
  Chilchota Alimentos – manufactures cheese, yogurt, cream, margarine, candies and juices
  Comex Group 
  Corona  - beer
  DINA S.A. 
  Falco Electronics 
  Gamesa 
  Gruma – largest manufacturer of corn flour and tortillas in the world
  Grupo Bimbo – largest Mexican-owned baking company, with operations in the Americas, Asia, Africa and Europe
  Grupo Famsa
  Grupo Lala 
  Interjet – Mexican low-cost airline with its headquarters in Lomas de Chapultepec, Miguel Hidalgo, Mexico City, Mexico
  Italika
  Jumex 
  Kahlúa 
  Kamora 
  Keuka 
  Kyoto Electronics – its main business is the design and manufacture of consumer electronics, microelectronic systems and its  respective software
  La Costeña - food company
  Lanix – multinational electronics company based in Hermosillo; Mexico's largest domestically owned electronics company
  Mabe 
  Machina
  Mastretta 
  Mayordomo 
  Meebox 
  Mexichem
  Modelo - beer
  Olmeca Tequila 
  Pemex – Mexican state-owned petroleum company 
  Pineda Covalín 
  Pirma 
  Refmex GL Glass 
  Relojes Centenario 
  Selther 
  Sigma Alimentos 
  Softtek 
  Sol de Mexico Tequila 
  Solana - cottage manufacturer of sports, racing, and kids automobiles
  Soriana 
  Televisa
  TV Azteca 
  Telmex 
  Tornel 
  Vivaaerobus.com 
  Vodka Villa Lobos 
  Voit 
  Volaris – low-cost airline based in Santa Fe, Álvaro Obregón, Mexico City; its operational base is located at the General Abelardo L. Rodríguez International Airport (TIJ) in Tijuana

See also

 Economy of Mexico
 List of companies of Mexico
 List of hotels in Mexico
 Small and medium enterprises in Mexico

References

 
Mexican brands
Brands